Iraq made its West Asian Games debut at the 3rd West Asian Games held in Doha, Qatar from December 1, 2005 to December 10, 2005. Iraq ranked 10th with 2 gold medals, a lone silver medal and 7 bronze in this edition of the West Asian Games.

References

West Asian Games
Nations at the 2005 West Asian Games
West Asian Games
Iraq at the West Asian Games